"Ako'y may alaga" (occasionally referred to as "Asong mataba" or "Ang aking alaga") is a Filipino poem in the Tagalog language of unknown authorship taught in elementary schools across the Philippines, typically in Kindergarten and grade 1. While many different versions exist, most versions are similar to the following:

Owing to the poem's popularity in the country, the pinoy rock band Siakol recorded a song to an expanded version of the poem in their 1996 album, Tayo Na Sa Paraiso. Poems based on the original, written by Filipino elementary school students, can be found in professional journals from as early as 1977.

Notes

References 

Philippine poetry
Anonymous works